= 2025 Lower Carniola floods =

2025 flood in Lower Carniola

in September 2025, flooding occurred in some parts of the Lower Carniola region, Slovenia. due to severe storms.
